In snakes, the interorbital scales, or intersupraoculars, are the scales on the top of the head between the plates surmounting the eyes (the supraoculars).

See also
 Supraocular scales
 Snake scales

References

Snake scales